Human Error is a 2004 film directed by Robert M. Young. It stars Caroline Ashley and Xander Berkeley.

Cast
Caroline Ashley as Catherine
Xander Berkeley as Hanrahan
Tom Bower as Merkin
Sarah Clarke as Company Spokesperson
Robert Knott as Dobbitt

References

External links

2004 films
Films directed by Robert M. Young
2004 comedy films
2000s English-language films